Hajjiabad (also Romanized as Ḩājjīābād and Ḩājīābād; also known as Ḩājjīābād-e Pol-e Ābgīneh) is a village in Balyan Rural District, in the Central District of Kazerun County, Fars Province, Iran. At the 2006 census, its population was 350, in 72 families.

References 

Populated places in Kazerun County